Zargyar Vtoroye may refer to:
 Araz Zargyar, Azerbaijan
 Zərgər, Azerbaijan